Bhulekha (Punjabi: روزوار بُھلیكھا ) is a Punjabi daily newspaper in Pakistan. Bhulekha is currently publishing from seven stations in Pakistan alongside eveninger Punjabi Zuban and Lokaai. Bilal Mudassar Butt is the editor of Bhulekha. Mudasssar Iqbal Butt is the CEO and publisher of Bhulekha. Bhulekha are World wide reporters, Imran Choudary reporter's for France and Europe. M.Kamal for Australia and New Zealand, M. Khowaja and Rafiq Ahmed for USA.

See also 
 List of newspapers in Pakistan
 List of Punjabi-language newspapers

References

External links
 Bhulekha ePaper
 bhulekh

Punjabi-language newspapers published in Pakistan
Daily newspapers published in Pakistan
Mass media companies of Pakistan